Kršanje is a village located in the city of Užice, southwestern Serbia. As of 2011 census, the village had a population of 108 inhabitants.

References

Užice
Populated places in Zlatibor District